is a former backstroke swimmer from Japan. At the 2000 Summer Olympics in Sydney, Nakamura won the silver medal in the 100m Backstroke and a bronze medal as part of the Women's Relay Team for the 4 x 100 metre Medley.

At one point, she was a holder of the 50 m backstroke world record.

See also
 World record progression 50 metres backstroke

References
 
 

1979 births
Living people
People from Nagaoka, Niigata
Sportspeople from Niigata Prefecture
Japanese female backstroke swimmers
Olympic swimmers of Japan
Swimmers at the 1996 Summer Olympics
Swimmers at the 2000 Summer Olympics
Olympic silver medalists for Japan
Olympic bronze medalists for Japan
World record setters in swimming
Olympic bronze medalists in swimming
World Aquatics Championships medalists in swimming
Medalists at the FINA World Swimming Championships (25 m)
Asian Games medalists in swimming
Swimmers at the 1994 Asian Games
Swimmers at the 1998 Asian Games
Medalists at the 1994 Asian Games
Medalists at the 1998 Asian Games
Medalists at the 2000 Summer Olympics
Olympic silver medalists in swimming
Universiade medalists in swimming
Asian Games silver medalists for Japan
Asian Games bronze medalists for Japan
Universiade gold medalists for Japan
Universiade silver medalists for Japan
Medalists at the 2001 Summer Universiade
20th-century Japanese women
21st-century Japanese women